Folts may refer to:

People
 Arina Folts (born 1997), Uzbekistani tennis player
 James E. Folts (born 1940), U.S. bishop of the Episcopal Diocese of West Texas
 Jonas Folts (1808-1876), U.S. farmer and politician
 Jonathan Folts (born 1968), U.S. prelate of the Episcopal Church; eleventh Bishop of South Dakota

Other uses
 Folts Mission Institute, defunct Methodist training school in New York